Robert Calder (born 2 January 1907) was a Scottish professional footballer.

Calder played in Canada during the early stages of his career for Bell Telephone, Toronto Scottish, and Montreal Carsteel in the Canadian National Soccer League and played for a Toronto All-Stars side in 2 matches against a Scottish FA XI in 1927. He returned to his native Scotland in 1933 to join Rangers, making one appearance in a 3–1 victory over Queen's Park in the Scottish Cup. Calder joined Football League Third Division South side Cardiff City at the start of the 1933–34 season and established himself in the first-team, playing 37 times in the league for the club, but the club finished bottom of the Football League and Calder was one of a number of players released at the end of the season by manager Ben Watts-Jones. He later played for Bradford City, Newport County and Barrow.

References

1907 births
1973 deaths
Year of death missing
Footballers from Glasgow
Scottish footballers
Association football defenders
Toronto Scottish players
Montreal Carsteel players
Rangers F.C. players
Cardiff City F.C. players
Newport County A.F.C. players
Barrow A.F.C. players
Canadian National Soccer League players
English Football League players
Bradford City A.F.C. players
British expatriate sportspeople in Canada
Expatriate soccer players in Canada
Scottish expatriate footballers